Kungwini Local Municipality was a local municipality in the Metsweding District of Gauteng in South Africa. The town of Bronkhorstspruit was the seat of the municipality.

Kungwini, along with the Metsweding District, was disestablished and absorbed into the Tshwane Metropolitan Municipality on 18 May 2011, the date of the 2011 municipal election.

Kungwini is an isiNdebele word meaning "mist". Because the area is misty, the name was relevant for the local community.

Main places
Main places of the municipality, from the 2001 census:

References

Local municipalities of the Metsweding District Municipality